Cătălin Constantin Barbu (born 5 August 1999) is a Romanian professional footballer who plays as a forward for Crișul Chișineu-Criș. Barbu started his career at FC Argeș Pitești, club for which he played in more than 50 league and cup games.

Personal life
Cătălin Barbu is the son of former footballer Constantin "Jean" Barbu. Jean Barbu played for teams such as FC Argeș Pitești, Suwon Samsung Bluewings, FC Rapid București or CD Numancia.

References

External links
 
 
 Cătălin Barbu at lpf.ro

1999 births
Living people
Sportspeople from Pitești
Romanian footballers
Association football forwards
Liga I players
Liga II players
Liga III players
AFC Chindia Târgoviște players
FC Argeș Pitești players